Ryan Lees (born 16 February 1994) is an Australian cricketer. He made his List A debut for Cricket Australia XI on 7 October 2015 in the 2015–16 Matador BBQs One-Day Cup. He made his first-class debut for Cricket Australia XI against the West Indians during their tour of Australia in December 2015.

References

External links
 

1994 births
Living people
Australian cricketers
Cricket Australia XI cricketers
Place of birth missing (living people)